
Gmina Staszów is an urban-rural gmina (administrative district) in Staszów County, Świętokrzyskie Voivodeship, in south-central Poland.

Demography 
According to the 2011 Poland census, there were 26,077 people residing in Staszów Commune, of whom 48.8% were male and 51.2% were female (out of which the population in rural areas amounts to 10,969, of whom 49.6% were male and 50.4% were female). In the commune, the population was spread out, with 19.4% under the age of 18, 38.3% from 18 to 44, 25.1% from 45 to 64, and 17.1% who were 65 years of age or older (out of which the population in rural areas amounts to 20% under the age of 18, 38.5% from 18 to 44, 22.8% from 45 to 64, and 18.6% who were 65 years of age or older).
 Figure 1. Population pyramid of commune in 2010 – by age group and sex
 Figure 2. Population pyramid in rural areas in 2010 – by age group and sex

Villages
Apart from the town of Staszów, Gmina Staszów contains the villages and settlements of Czajków Północny, Czajków Południowy, Czernica, Dobra, Gaj Koniemłocki, Grzybów, Jasień, Koniemłoty, Kopanina, Krzczonowice, Krzywołęcz, Kurozwęki, Łaziska, Lenartowice, Łukawica, Mostki, Niemścice, Oględów, Poddębowiec, Podmaleniec, Ponik, Sielec, Smerdyna, Stefanówek, Sztombergi, Wiązownica Duża, Wiązownica Mała, Wiązownica-Kolonia, Wiśniowa, Wiśniowa Poduchowna, Wola Osowa, Wola Wiśniowska, Wólka Żabna, Zagrody and Ziemblice.

Neighbouring gminas
Gmina Staszów is bordered by the gminas of Bogoria, Klimontów, Osiek, Raków, Rytwiany, Szydłów and Tuczępy.

References

External links
Polish official population figures 2006

Staszow
Staszów County